In mathematics and computer science, the BIT predicate, sometimes written BIT(i, j), is a predicate that tests whether the jth bit of the number i (starting from the least significant digit) is 1, when i is written in binary.

History
The BIT predicate was first introduced in 1937 by Wilhelm Ackermann to define the Ackermann coding, which encodes hereditarily finite sets as natural numbers. The BIT predicate can be used to perform membership tests for the encoded sets.

Description

In mathematical notation, the BIT predicate can be described as

where  is the floor function and mod is the modulo function.

The BIT predicate is primitive recursive.

Implementation
In programming languages such as C, C++, Java, or Python that provide a right shift operator >> and a bitwise Boolean and operator &, the BIT predicate BIT can be implemented by the expression
(i>>j)&1. The subexpression i>>j shifts these bits so that bit  is shifted to position 0, and the subexpression &1 masks off the remaining bits, leaving only the bit in position 0. The value of the expression is 1 or 0, respectively as the value of BIT is false or true.

For a set represented as a bit array, the BIT predicate can be used to test set membership. For instance, subsets of the non-negative integers  may be represented by a bit array with a one in position  when  is a member of the subset, and a zero in that position when it is not a member. When such a bit array is interpreted as a binary number, the set  for  all distinct is represented as the binary number .

The same technique may be used to encode subsets of any sequence  of distinct values, using powers of two whose exponents are the positions of the elements in this sequence, rather than their values. Ackermann's encoding of the hereditarily finite sets is an example of this technique, for the recursively-generated sequence of hereditarily finite sets.

Applications

Private information retrieval
In the mathematical study of computer security, the private information retrieval problem can be modeled as one in which a client, communicating with a collection of servers that store a binary number i, wishes to determine the result of a BIT predicate BIT(i, j) without divulging the value of j to the servers.  describe a method for replicating i across two servers in such a way that the client can solve the private information retrieval problem using a substantially smaller amount of communication than would be necessary to recover the complete value of i.

Mathematical logic
The BIT predicate is often examined in the context of first-order logic, where systems of logic result from adding the BIT predicate to first-order logic.  In descriptive complexity, the complexity class FO + BIT resulting from adding the BIT predicate to FO results in a more robust complexity class.  The class FO + BIT, of first-order logic with the BIT predicate, is the same as the class FO + PLUS + TIMES, of first-order logic with addition and multiplication predicates.

Construction of the Rado graph

Ackermann in 1937 and Richard Rado in 1964 used this predicate to construct the infinite Rado graph.

The resulting graph has many important properties: it contains every finite undirected graph as an induced subgraph, and any isomorphism of its induced subgraphs can be extended to a symmetry of the whole graph.

References

Binary arithmetic
Descriptive complexity
Circuit complexity
Set theory